Marrs is a surname. Notable persons with that name include:

 Anna Marrs (born 1974), American banker
 Audrey Marrs (born 1970), American film producer
 Elijah P. Marrs (1840–1910), American minister and educator
 Jarrod Marrs (born 1975), American breaststroke swimmer
 Jim Marrs (1943–2017), American journalist and conspiracy theorist
 Lee Marrs (born 1945), American comic book writer and animator
 Steven Marrs (born 1967), American TV producer
 Texe Marrs (1944–2019), American author and researcher

See also
 Marrs Township
 Marrs Hill Township
 Marrs Center
 M|A|R|R|S, British electronic music group
 Mars (disambiguation)